Dylan Marie Dreyer (born August 2, 1981) is an American television meteorologist working for NBC News. She is also an anchor on Today's 3rd Hour. Dreyer frequently appears on Today on weekdays as a weather correspondent and as a fill-in for Al Roker and Carson Daly. She also appears on The Weather Channel and on NBC Nightly News. Dreyer joined NBC News in September 2012 after having worked at the now former NBC station WHDH in Boston, Massachusetts since 2007.

Early life and education
Dreyer was born and raised in Manalapan Township, New Jersey and attended Manalapan High School, where she played softball and graduated in 1999. She earned a bachelor's degree in meteorology from  Rutgers University in 2003. While in college, Dreyer briefly interned at WeatherWorks, a private consulting company in Hackettstown, NJ.

Career

Dreyer has worked at WICU in Erie, Pennsylvania; WJAR in Providence, Rhode Island; and WHDH in Boston, Massachusetts.

Dreyer was in a car crash while en route to cover a blizzard for Today on February 9, 2013, she suffered a mild concussion.

In addition to her meteorological duties, Dreyer is the host of the NBC educational nature program Earth Odyssey with Dylan Dreyer broadcast on The More You Know block of programming on NBC.

Personal life
Dylan married NBC News producer and cameraman Brian Fichera in 2012. They live in the New York area. On June 10, 2016, Dreyer announced on Today that she was expecting her first child. On December 17, 2016, she gave birth to her first child, a son, Calvin. On July 17, 2019, Dreyer announced on Today that she was expecting her second child in January 2020. On January 2, 2020, she gave birth to her second child, a son, Oliver.  On September 29, 2021, she gave birth to her third child, a son, Russell James. Her last day on Weekend Today was January 29, 2022, but she will remain on the Third Hour.

In 1963, Dreyer's grandmother, Doris Milke, was a record-setting winner on the original version of The Price Is Right.

References

The Weather Channel people
Living people
1981 births
Television meteorologists in New York City
Manalapan High School alumni
People from Manalapan Township, New Jersey
Rutgers University alumni
American meteorologists
American television hosts